Rómulo Resiste, also stylized as RR or Rómulo Renuncia Resiste, is a 2021 documentary film directed by Venezuelan filmmaker . The documentary focuses on the presidency of Rómulo Betancourt between 1959 and 1964.

Plot 
Rómulo Betancourt is the first elected president of Venezuela to receive power from another one democratically elected. His government, between 1959 and 1964, had to face two main challenges: military authoritarianism and Marxism, both of which sought to impose a different model from representative democracy. The narration of historical events is intertwined with the childhood experiences of the documentary director, Carlos Oteyza. The film includes the testimonies of both political protagonists of the 1960s, historians and intellectuals, images from domestic and international archives and animated 3D sequences. The documentary is narrated by the actor and psychologist Sócrates Serrano.

Testimonies

Reception 
Venezuelan film critic Sergio Monsalve praised the documentary.

See also 
 Tiempos de dictadura
 CAP 2 Intentos
 El pueblo soy yo

References

External links 
 Official website
 #Documental - Rómulo Resiste - YouTube, Cinesa Channel
 Rómulo Resiste at FilmAffinity
 Rómulo Resiste at Goliiive
 Rómulo Resiste at TicketPlate
 Carlos Oteyza: “La historia de Rómulo Betancourt es una mina de narraciones”, El Pitazo, 2 October 2021

2020s Spanish-language films
2021 documentary films
2021 films
Documentary films about Venezuela
Venezuelan documentary films
Rómulo Betancourt